Tan Sri Quek Leng Chan (born 8 December 1941) is a Malaysian tycoon who co-founded Hong Leong Group Malaysia. In 2018, Quek Leng Chan ranked #217 on the Forbes World's Billionaires list, with wealth listed at US$7.2 billion. As for 16 February 2021, Tan Sri Quek's net worth is listed at US$9.9 billion and ranked 147th on Forbes.

Early life and education

Quek Leng Chan studied in Victoria School in Singapore and is qualified as a barrister-at-law from Middle Temple, United Kingdom.

Career
He has extensive business experience in various sectors, including financial services, manufacturing and real estate.  He is the chairman and chief executive officer of Hong Leong Company (Malaysia) Berhad ("HLCM"), executive chairman of Hong Leong Industries Berhad ("HLI"), Hume Industries (Malaysia) Berhad ("HIMB"), Hong Leong Financial Group Berhad, GuocoLand (Malaysia) Berhad, Camerlin Group Berhad and chairman of Hong Leong Bank Berhad, HLG Capital Berhad ("HLG"), Hong Leong Assurance Berhad, Hong Leong Islamic Bank Berhad and Hong Leong Foundation ("HLF").

Quek oversees the Malaysian operations of the Hong Leong Group while his cousin Kwek Leng Beng oversees the Singapore operations.

In September 2022, he was appointed chairman of the board of the real estate company GuocoLand Ltd.

Honours
  :
  Officer of the Order of the Defender of the Realm (KMN) (1976)
  Companion of the Order of Loyalty to the Crown of Malaysia (JSM) (1991)
  Commander of the Order of Loyalty to the Crown of Malaysia (PSM) - Tan Sri (1994)

References

External links
 Guoco raid on BIL shares triggers takeover
 HK's Guoco Group offers US$584m for BIL
 Narra Industries Bhd (Kuala Lumpur Stock Exchange) 
 Hoovers
 Chairman Quek Leng Chan Makes Low-Profile Visit to Molokai Ranch
 Insider:   Quek Leng Chan
 Room At The Top - Kwek Leng Beng
 The Other Kwek

1941 births
Living people
Hokkien businesspeople
Singaporean emigrants to Malaysia
Singaporean people of Hokkien descent
Malaysian billionaires
Malaysian bankers
Malaysian people of Chinese descent
Victoria School, Singapore alumni
Malaysian company founders
Malaysian chairpersons of corporations
Officers of the Order of the Defender of the Realm
Companions of the Order of Loyalty to the Crown of Malaysia
Commanders of the Order of Loyalty to the Crown of Malaysia